Gononemertes australiensis is a parasitic ribbon worm. It lives commensally in the ascidian Pyura pachydermatina found in the sublittoral waters of the New Zealand. G. australiensis was found in specimens of P. pachydermatina collected in Sydney harbor. These worms were found specifically in the atrium of P. pachydermatina.
It is dioecious and has several gonads. Each of its gonads produce several oocytes while the male worms carry testes along its parenchyma. Fertilization is external.

Notes

References

Prosorhochmidae
Animals described in 1974